Neela Bhagwat is a Hindustani musician of the Gwalior Gharana as represented by Pandit Sharatchandra Arolkar who studied with Krishnarao Shankar Pandit. Neela Bhagwat's other teacher is Jal Balaporia. Known for composing and performing thumris from a feminist perspective, her contributions include compositions of Kabir and Meera bhajans.

References

Gwalior gharana
20th-century Indian singers
Living people
Year of birth missing (living people)
Indian women classical singers
Singers from Pune
Women musicians from Maharashtra
20th-century Indian women singers